Jaeden Mercure (born March 14, 2003) is a Canadian soccer player who plays as a midfielder for Ottawa South United in the Première Ligue de soccer du Québec.

Early life
Growing up, Mercure played hockey and soccer, joining Ottawa South United when he was nine years old. In 2017, he joined the Vancouver Whitecaps Academy Residency Program. Afterwards, he returned to OSU in 2018.

He was set to attend MacEwan University and play for the men's soccer team beginning in 2021, but ultimately did not join them.

Career
On August 17, 2019, he made his debut for the senior team of Ottawa South United in League1 Ontario against Master's FA, which was his only appearance of the season. After appearing with the reserve squad in the 2020 season, he returned to the senior team in 2021, now in the Première Ligue de soccer du Québec.

On August 10, 2021, he joined Canadian Premier League club Atlético Ottawa, signing a Canadian Developmental contract, allowing his to retain his university eligibility, as well as to continue playing with his local team, Ottawa South United. The move was facilitated through the affiliation the two clubs. He made his professional debut on September 1, coming on as a substitute against York United FC.

Career statistics

Club

References

2003 births
Living people
Canadian soccer players
Association football forwards
Vancouver Whitecaps Residency players
Ottawa South United players
Atlético Ottawa players
Canadian Premier League players
Première ligue de soccer du Québec players
League1 Ontario players